Ichapur is a village and gram panchayat, near Gobardanga in North 24 Parganas district, West Bengal state. It is situated on the bank of Jamuna River, a tributary of Ichamati River.

Administration and politics
Ichapur is part of the Gaighata community development block in Bangaon subdivision of North 24 Parganas district.  Ichapur I, Ichapur II, are part of the Gaighata West Bengal Legislative Assembly (Vidhan Sabha) constituency.

1) Ichapur I office in Gaighata.

2) Ichapur II office in Thakurnagar.

Culture
Ichapur is famous for its Krishno temple, known as 'Gobindo Mandir'. This temple is more than 300 years old, and is now governed by GSI. Recently a magazine “ইছাপুর বার্তা (Ichapur Barta)” based on socio-economical condition, local history, news and literature published from here.

Education
Village has 2 primary schools and one higher secondary school. It also has a girls Secondary School. Ichapur Free Primary School is the oldest Primary School in this locality. It is more than 150 Years old. Iswar Chandra Vidyasagar paid a visit in this school. Ichapur High School, a Co Ed School of this area is a leading School of this subdivision. In 2011, it has been announced as Model Resource Centre of Gaighata Block by the Sarva Sikhsha Mission. More than 1200 students study in this school. Besides normal secondary and Higher secondary section, it also provides Tailoring, Health Worker and Telephone Mobile Repairing courses which are done for VIII pass persons. Recently Rabindra Mukta Vidyalaya, an approved body of Govt. of West Bengal has recognized it as a study centre for Madhyamik.

Transport
Nearest rail station is Gobardanga  (5 km). It is Connected by Bus -DN12, Auto services and trolley van services. One can travel by car from Maslandpur or Gobardanga. The distance between Ichapur and Sealdah is 62 km. While Gaighta Police Station is 3 km away.

References 

Villages in North 24 Parganas district